UDR may refer to:

 Ulster Defence Regiment, a former British Army infantry regiment
 Universal dielectric response, An emergent scaling behaviour in heterogeneous materials under alternating current
 União Democrática Ruralista, a Brazilian right-wing association of farmers
 Union of Democrats for the Republic, a former political party in France
 Union for Democracy and the Republic (Chad), a political party in Chad
 Democratic Union for the Republic, a former political party in Italy
 UDR, Inc., a real estate company in the United States
 Udaipur Airport, Indian airport (IATA airport code)
 Untethered dead reckoning, GNSS-assisted dead reckoning without external sensors
 User-Defined Reductions in OpenMP
 U.D.R., Brazilian comedy rock band.
 Univision Deportes Radio, a Spanish language sports radio network in the United States.

See also
Udr or Uðr, one of the Nine Daughters of Ægir in Norse mythology
Umpire Decision Review System (UDRS)